The 2001 Toray Pan Pacific Open was a women's tennis tournament played on indoor carpet courts at the Tokyo Metropolitan Gymnasium in Tokyo in Japan and was part of Tier I of the 2001 WTA Tour. The tournament ran from January 30 through February 4, 2001. Lindsay Davenport won the singles title.

Finals

Singles

 Lindsay Davenport defeated  Martina Hingis 6–7(4–7), 6–4, 6–2
 It was Davenport's 1st singles title of the year and the 31st of her career.

Doubles

 Lisa Raymond /  Rennae Stubbs defeated  Anna Kournikova /  Iroda Tulyaganova 7–6(7–5), 2–6, 7–6(8–6)
 It was Raymond's 1st title of the year and the 21st of her career. It was Stubbs' 1st title of the year and the 25th of her career.

External links
 Official website 
 Official website 
 WTA Tournament Profile

Toray Pan Pacific Open
Pan Pacific Open
Toray Pan Pacific Open
Toray Pan Pacific Open
Toray Pan Pacific Open
Toray Pan Pacific Open